The S2 is a railway service of the S-Bahn Zürich on the Zürcher Verkehrsverbund (ZVV) transportation network, and is one of the network's services connecting the canton of Zürich with the cantons of Schwyz and St. Gallen.

Route 
 

The service links Zurich Airport with Ziegelbrücke, a village and railway junction on the border between the cantons of St. Gallen and Glarus. On weekends, every other train continues to Unterterzen. From the airport, the service runs via Oerlikon and the Weinberg Tunnel to Zürich Hauptbahnhof. From Zürich Hauptbahnhof, the service uses the Lake Zürich left-bank railway line to Ziegelbrücke, stopping only at selected stations.

 
 
 Zürich Hauptbahnhof

Route map

Rolling stock 
 all services are operated with RABe 514 class trains.

Scheduling 
The train frequency is usually 30 minutes and the trip takes 65 minutes between Zürich Airport and Ziegelbrücke, and an additional 13 minutes from Ziegelbrücke to Unterterzen.

History 
Originally, the S2 operated between Zürich airport and Ziegelbrücke. The S27 (March shuttle), which is not part of the Zürich S-Bahn network (or the St. Gallen S-Bahn network), was introduced, replacing the S2 between Ziegelbrücke and Siebnen-Wangen (operates only during peak-hour).

See also 
 Rail transport in Switzerland
 Trams in Zürich

References

External links 

 ZVV

Zürich S-Bahn lines
Canton of Glarus
Canton of Schwyz
Transport in the canton of St. Gallen
Transport in the canton of Zürich